Demet Gül (born 1982, Stuttgart, West Germany) is a German-Turkish actress.

Life and career 
Gül grew up as a daughter of Turkish immigrants in Stuttgart. She completed her theatre study at the Otto Falckenberg School of the Performing Arts in Munich and worked on several productions of the Bayerische Theaterakademie August Everding and the Bavarian State Opera as an actress. She played one of the main roles in the feature film Almanya: Welcome to Germany (2011).

Filmography (selection) 
 2011: Almanya: Welcome to Germany
 2013: 
 2014: Ulan İstanbul - Turkish series
 2016: Ask Laftan Anlama - Turkish series
 2018: Arka Sokaklar - Turkish Series
 2021: Akrep - Turkish Series

References

External links 
 
 Page about Demet Gül on the homepage of her agency

1982 births
Living people
German film actresses
Actresses from Stuttgart
German stage actresses
German people of Turkish descent
Date of birth missing (living people)